Ivak or Ivek may refer to:
 Ivak, Hamadan
 Ivek, Mazandaran